This is a list of cemeteries in Georgia.

Cemeteries in Georgia

 Black Pioneers Cemetery, Euharlee, Georgia
 Ebenezer Cemetery, Jerusalem Lutheran Church, Rincon, founded 1733 by Lutheran refugees from Salzburg, Austria
 Forest Lawn Cemetery, College Park 
 Georgia National Cemetery
 Greenwood Cemetery, Atlanta
 Laurel Grove Cemetery
 Levi Sheftall Family Cemetery, Savannah
 Lincoln Cemetery, Atlanta 
 Linwood Cemetery (Columbus, Georgia)
 Magnolia Cemetery, Augusta, Georgia
 Marietta Confederate Cemetery
 Martin Luther King Jr. Center for Nonviolent Social Change, Atlanta 
 Memory Hill Cemetery
 Mordecai Sheftall Cemetery, Savannah

 Oak Hill Cemetery, Cartersville, Georgia
 Patrick R. Cleburne Confederate Cemetery – large memorial cemetery with hundreds of unmarked confederate graves from the Civil War
 Resaca Confederate Cemetery, Resaca, Georgia
 South Bend Cemetery
 South-View Cemetery, Atlanta
 Southview Cemetery, Augusta, Georgia
 Summerville Cemetery, Augusta, Georgia
 Sunbury Cemetery, Sunbury, Georgia
 St. James Episcopal Cemetery, Marietta
 Westview Cemetery, Atlanta (largest civilian cemetery in southeastern United States)

Cemeteries on the National Register of Historic Places in Georgia

 Andersonville National Historic Site
 Basket Creek Cemetery
 Behavior Cemetery
 Bonaventure Cemetery, Savannah, made famous by the Bird Girl sculpture featured on the cover of the book, and in the movie of, Midnight in the Garden of Good and Evil
 City Cemetery (Sandersville, Georgia)
 Crawford-Dorsey House and Cemetery
 Colored Cemetery
 Decatur Cemetery
 Jackson Street Cemetery, Athens
 Lott Cemetery
 Marietta National Cemetery
 McCanaan Missionary Baptist Church and Cemetery
 Midway Historic District, Midway, Georgia
 Myrtle Hill Cemetery, Rome, Georgia
 Notchaway Baptist Church and Cemetery
 Oakland Cemetery, Atlanta 
 Oconee Hill Cemetery, Athens 
 Old City Cemetery, Columbus, Georgia
 Riverside Cemetery, Macon
 Robert Mable House and Cemetery
 Rose Hill Cemetery, Macon 
 Sunset Hill Cemetery
 Upper Lott's Creek Primitive Baptist Church and Cemetery

See also
 List of cemeteries in the United States

References

 

Cemeteries in Georgia (U.S. state)
Georgia